Selkirk is an extinct town in New Madrid County, in the U.S. state of Missouri. The GNIS classifies it as a populated place.

Selkirk was laid out ca. 1905, taking its name from the Selkirk family, the original owners of the town site.

References

Ghost towns in Missouri
Former populated places in New Madrid County, Missouri